Christophe Destruhaut (born January 24, 1973, in Mont-de-Marsan) is a retired French professional football player.

External links

1973 births
Living people
French footballers
AC Ajaccio players
Le Havre AC players
Blagnac FC players
Gazélec Ajaccio players
Ligue 1 players
Ligue 2 players
Championnat National players
Association football defenders